Joseph R. McLaughlin (June 5, 1851 – July 3, 1932) was an entrepreneur and politician from the U.S. state of Michigan, serving as the 29th lieutenant governor of Michigan from 1895 to 1897.

McLaughlin was a graduate and alumnus of the University of Michigan, Literary Class of 1877, Law Class of 1879.

Early in 1886 McLaughlin thought he could see a future for electricity and undertook the organization of the Edison Company in Detroit. This company was organized in just six weeks from the time he undertook it. At that time it was the largest Edison illuminating company in the United States except the one at the Pearl Street Station, New York City, and had a capital of $250,000. Organizing this company McLaughlin was its Secretary and Manager during the construction of the plant and the first two years of its operation placing it upon a good paying basis. The Edison General Company recognized his ability as an organizer and made him their general agent for Ohio.

Prior to serving as lieutenant governor, McLaughlin was also a successful real estate developer in and around Detroit, MI. Arden Park-East Boston was originally called the McLaughlin's and Owens Subdivision, the development was platted on June 1, 1892 by McLaughlin and Edmund J. Owen.

McLaughlin was president pro tempore of the Michigan Senate in 1895 when Lieutenant Governor Alfred Milnes was chosen in a special election to replace Julius C. Burrows in the U.S. House.  McLaughlin, at the resignation of Milnes, performed duties as the lieutenant governor under Governor John T. Rich from June 1, 1895 to January 1, 1897.

McLaughlin relocated to Seattle, WA where in 1906. Joseph R. McLaughlin, Paul C. Murphy, and Frank F. Mead pressed ahead with development [of "Laurelhurst"]. Realtors affixed enticing names to their peninsula developments. Besides "Laurelhurst," there was "Laurelhurst Heights," "The Palisades," "McLaughlin's Lawn Acres," and "Scottish Heights."

References
Michigan Manual 2003-2004, Chapter IV, Former Officials of Michigan
The Michigan Alumnus, Vol. III, November 1896, No. 20
Detroit in History and Commerce, by James J. Mitchell
Arden Park-East Boston Historic District – Detroit, Michigan
Seattle Neighborhoods: Laurelhurst -- Thumbnail History

1851 births
1932 deaths
Lieutenant Governors of Michigan
Michigan state senators
University of Michigan Law School alumni
19th-century American politicians